Atyphella is a genus of 'flashing' firefly (family Lampyridae) found in the Australasian region, particularly in the eastern and northern regions of Australia. The genus consists of 23 recognized species, 14 considered to be endemic to Australia.

Description
The larval stage of Atyphella is morphologically similar to the Luciola larval stage, the key difference being that the Atyphella possess a series of flat projections on the sides of the body (known as explanate tergites).

Atyphella antennae are relatively short, shorter than the widest part of the head. This is almost unique among the genera of the subfamily Luciolinae with Bourgeoisia being the only other to feature this.

The adult Atyphella head is concealed under an extended pronotum and recessed into the prothoracic cavity. This effectively eliminates upwards vision when in flight and in a resting state. However, it has been observed that some species can extend the head beyond the pronotum in active searching when on the ground.

Other notable morphological features of the genus Atyphella include a head longer than it is wide and ventrally subcontiguous eyes.

Most Atyphella females are flightless and possess reduced elytra.

Taxonomy
The taxonomic ranking of the Atyphella has been somewhat disputed. It was originally described in 1889 as a separate genus under Lampyridae. This was changed in 1964 when it was grouped under the genus Luciola as a subgenus (along with Pygoluciola). In 2000 it was again distinguished as a separate genus. This is the current accepted taxonomy, sitting as a sister group to Pygoluciola.

Species list
Twenty-three species are currently recognised:

Atyphella aphrogeneia (Ballantyne, 1979)
Atyphella atra Lea, 1921
Atyphella brevis Lea, 1909
Atyphella conspicua Ballantyne, 2000
Atyphella dalmatia Ballantyne & Lambkin, 2009
Atyphella ellioti Ballantyne, 2000
Atyphella flammans Olliff, 1890
Atyphella flammulans Ballantyne, 2000
Atyphella guerini (Ballantyne, 2000)
Atyphella immaculata Ballantyne, 2000
Atyphella inconspicua (Lea, 1921)
Atyphella kirakira Ballantyne & Lambkin, 2009
Atyphella lamingtonia Ballantyne & Lambkin, 2009
Atyphella leucura (Olivier, 1906)
Atyphella lewisi Ballantyne, 2000
Atyphella lychnus Olliff, 1890
Atyphella monteithi Ballantyne, 2000
Atyphella olivieri Lea, 1915
Atyphella palauensis Wittmer, 1958
Atyphella scabra Olivier, 1911
Atyphella scintillans Olliff, 1890
Atyphella similis Ballantyne, 2000
Atyphella testaceolineata Pic, 1939

Footnotes

References 
 
  (1987): Lucioline morphology, taxonomy and behaviour: A reappraisal (Coleoptera, Llampyridae). Transactions of the American Entomological Society 113(2): 171–188. Fulltext
  (2008): Pygoluciola satoi, a new species of the rare southeast Asian firefly genus Pygoluciola Wittmer (Coleoptera: Lampyridae: Luciolinae) from the Philippines. Raffles Bulletin of Zoology 56(1): 1–9. PDF fulltext
  (2006): A phylogenetic reassessment of the rare S.E. Asian firefly genus Pygoluciola Wittmer (Coleoptera: Lampyridae: Luciolinae). The Raffles Bulletin of Zoology 54(1): 21-48 PDF fulltext
  (2009): Systematics of Indo-Pacific fireflies with a redefinition of Australasian Atyphella Olliff, Madagascan Photuroluciola Pic, and description of seven new genera from the Luciolinae (Coleoptera: Lampyridae). Zootaxa 1997: 1–188 PDF abstract
  (1964): The Taxonomy of the Lampyridae (Coleoptera). Transactions of the American Entomological Society  90(1): 1-72 Fulltext

External links 
 Australian distribution of Atyphella 
 Springbrook firefly research

Lampyridae
Lampyridae genera
Bioluminescent insects